Collette René Coullard is an American mathematician, industrial engineer, operations researcher, and matroid theorist known for her research on combinatorial optimization problems that combine facility location and stock management. Formerly a professor at Purdue University, the University of Waterloo, Northwestern University, and Lake Superior State University, she has retired to become a professor emeritus.

Education and career
Coullard graduated in 1980 from Lake Superior State University, and earned her Ph.D. in 1985 from Northwestern University. Her dissertation, Minors of 3-Connected Matroids and Adjoints of Binary Matroids, concerned matroid theory and was supervised by Robert E. Bixby.

She taught at Purdue University and the University of Waterloo before returning to Northwestern as a faculty member in 1990, and retired as a mathematics professor from Lake Superior State University in 2018. She has also visited the University of Bonn as a Humboldt Fellow.

Recognition
Coullard was a Charles Deering McCormick Professor of Teaching Excellence at Northwestern University from 1996 to 1999. In 2003, the Lake Superior State University Alumni Association gave her their annual Kenneth J. Shouldice Achievement Award.

References

External links

Year of birth missing (living people)
Living people
20th-century American mathematicians
21st-century American mathematicians
American women mathematicians
Operations researchers
Northwestern University alumni
Purdue University alumni
Northwestern University faculty
Lake Superior State University faculty
20th-century American women
21st-century American women